Mikado Township is a civil township of Alcona County in the U.S. state of Michigan. The population was 947 at the 2010 census.

Communities
Alvin was founded as a lumbering community and had its own post office from February 14, 1906 until February 15, 1911.
The community was named for Hugo Kurtz, and it began as a logging community around 1900. A post office opened briefly from July 31, 1909 until March 31, 1911.
The community was originally called West Greenbush and was founded by Daniel Bruce, who built a hotel for the area's lumbermen in 1886. He pursuaded the Detroit and Mackinac Railway to established a station through the area by traveling to Tawas City. He paid and requested to have the railway line built along the main line running northeast to Lincoln. Bruce also asked and received a post office on May 11, 1886. Bruce requested that the new post office and community be recognized under the names Bruceville or Bruce Crossing. Bruceville was rejected, and Bruce Crossing was already assigned to another community up north. The postal service instead chose the name Mikado for the new post office. The community incorporated as a village in 1906 but soon after disincorporated. The post office remains open and uses the 48745 ZIP Code, which serves most of Mikado Township and portions of several neighboring townships.

Geography

Major highways
 is a county-designated highway that runs through the northern portion of the township.
 is a county-designated highway that runs along the eastern edge of the township and intersects with F-30 in Mikado.

Demographics

As of the census of 2000, there were 1,043 people, 397 households, and 296 families residing in the township. The population density was 14.6 per square mile (5.6/km2). There were 666 housing units at an average density of 9.3 per square mile (3.6/km2). The racial makeup of the township was 96.64% White, 2.30% Native American, 0.10% from other races, and 0.96% from two or more races. Hispanic or Latino of any race were 0.86% of the population.

There were 397 households, out of which 28.0% had children under the age of 18 living with them, 64.2% were married couples living together, 4.3% had a female householder with no husband present, and 25.2% were non-families. 20.4% of all households were made up of individuals, and 9.6% had someone living alone who was 65 years of age or older. The average household size was 2.60 and the average family size was 2.97.

In the township the population was spread out, with 25.7% under the age of 18, 5.0% from 18 to 24, 26.0% from 25 to 44, 27.3% from 45 to 64, and 16.0% who were 65 years of age or older. The median age was 40 years. For every 100 females, there were 113.3 males. For every 100 females age 18 and over, there were 105.6 males.

The median income for a household in the township was $31,713, and the median income for a family was $35,417. Males had a median income of $30,375 versus $19,261 for females. The per capita income for the township was $16,886. About 6.9% of families and 14.2% of the population were below the poverty line, including 18.1% of those under age 18 and 12.8% of those age 65 or over.

Education
Mikado Township is served by two public school districts.  The majority of the township is served by Oscoda Area Schools to the south in Iosco County, while a small northwestern portion of the township is served by Alcona Community Schools.

References

Sources

External links
 Mikado Township official website

Townships in Alcona County, Michigan
Townships in Michigan